Volunteers for the Defense of the Homeland (VDP, Volontaires pour la défense de la patrie) is a self-defense armed group in Burkina Faso created to fight jihadist insurgents. It is an auxiliary force supporting the Burkina Faso Armed Forces.

History 
On November 7, 2019, following a jihadist attack on a mining convoy, the president of Burkina Faso called for the creation of a civilian self-defense force. On January 21, 2020, the parliament of Burkina Faso passed a law establishing the Volunteers for the Defense of the Homeland. The law stipulated that people could voluntarily join the VDP and that after 14 days of training they were to be equipped with communication and vision equipment, together with weapons. Members of the VDP have been accused of the murder of 19 men near Manja Hien in February 2020, and attacks on Peuhle villages in Yatenga, in which 43 people were killed.

On June 4, 2021, during the Solhan and Tadaryat massacres, jihadists attacked VDP barracks before attacking civilians. On June 11, 2021, six VDP fighters were killed in a jihadist ambush in Kogolbaraogo. In December 2021 a jihadist attack killed many VDP fighters including one of their leaders, Ladij Joro.

References 

Paramilitary organisations based in Burkina Faso
Jihadist insurgency in Burkina Faso